Qasr al-Qatraneh (alternatively: "Qatraneh" or "Qatrana Castle," "Fortress Qatrana," or "Khan Qatraneh") is an Ottoman structure which largely served to provide water and protection on the Syrian pilgrimage route between the Levant and the Gulf. It is located in modern-day Jordan, just off of the country's Desert Highway, approximately 90 kilometres south of Amman and northwest of the town of Qatraneh. It is one of at least ten khans that have been identified and documented along the Syrian pilgrimage route in Jordan.

History
The fort/castle is a three-story structure of basalt and limestone, notably with a large water reservoir (70m by 70m) that collects water thanks to proximity to nearby wadi (valleys). There are three phases at the site, including restoration work done by the Jordanian Department of Antiquities in the 1970s, the addition of machicolations boxes (projecting windows) in the 18th century, and the original building, including the first row of the arrowslits and crenellations. A photograph from the 19th century indicates that at least one of the second-story roofs may have been a hemispherical dome, suggesting possible use of the structure as a mosque.

The building is typically credited to the reign of Sultan Sulayman I in the year 1531. The Sultan provided funds to clean the pool. However, the testimony of medieval historical sources indicates previous existence, followed by re-building under the Ottomans; the earliest reference is from Ibn Habib Al-Halabi in the 14th century. As noted by archaeologist Reem Samed Al Shqour, ancient khans and their courtyard fortifications were obvious models upon which later peoples could build (literally and metaphorically). Shqour writes: "The basic layout known as the courtyard fortification pattern can be traced back as early as the Late Bronze and Iron Age structures in Jordan...Undoubtedly, the durability and survivability of these structures meant that succeeding polities were well aware of the existence and advantages...if not in possessing, rebuilding, and utilizing the older, original structures, then in using them as models for new building designed along the same of similar plan."

One of the primary functions of the fort would have been as defense, and this would have been the function of similar, more ancient structures. However, Shqour notes that Islamic presence in the region left a "unique Islamic stamp on the form of the qusur [castles]" and there are records of multiple functions for Castle Qatrana and its like—they served as dwelling places, trade centers, storehouses for pilgrims, and, perhaps uniquely in the case of Qatrana, as a rudimentary postal office in the 19th century.

Differing dates of construction
The largest group of historians believe that the castle dates back to the Ottoman Era. The Jordanian Department of Antiquities followed suit, cooperating with the Turkish government to do the necessary restoration. The former maintains that the building is from the Mamluk era, and referred to as Khan Qatraneh. Historical texts confirm that it was a hostel in 926 AH / 1520 BCE, when a Shami caravan returned from the Hajj, and pilgrims stayed in the al-Hasa region.

Water system
The residents that lived in the region during the Byzantine and Roman periods developed a system to bring water from vast, extensive terrain to the cities, towns, and villages and their buildings. The system is what we would now call a watershed. And the studies performed by the Department of Antiquities in the al-Qatraneh region reveal that they made channels to make water flow from the region of Wadi al-Hasa to the other nearby wadis and the nearby lake. The urgent need for the daily use of water and other uses has been the driver of the creation and design of these prominent water systems. So the water system in Qasr al-Qatraneh consists of two channels, a sediment basin, and a large pool to gather and harvest water, and a well located inside the castle. A rock channel was discovered, which was used to transfer water to the pond. What remains of these foundational stones that were discovered on the site near the valley accurately and precisely demonstrates the significant degree of mastery in construction and design in the system. In addition to the castle, there is a water facility that provided the residents with clean water for drinking, irrigation, and livestock. The main pond is at a distance of 26 metres from the castle, with dimensions of 70 X 70 metres, and a depth of 5.2 metres. The dam is 75 metres from the castle, and is 38 metres high and 6.6 metres wide and 2.4 metres deep. The two connecting channels are each 105 cm in diameter, and 90 cm from each other. South of the castle is Wadi Hanifa, which stretches from the southeast to the west, and Wadi Hafira, which converges with Wadi Hanifa. Both were the reason for the water harvesting system.

Outline
The castle is a rectangular building, 22.2 metres long, 17.35 wide, and c. 10 to 10.5 metres high. The walls of the castle were built of polished stones, and the palace from clay and limestone tiles, as was common in the region during the Mamluk period. The gate is on the eastern facade, about 3 metres tall, and has dimensions of 185 cm × 140 cm and a thickness of 35 cm. The door opens in a semi-circle, and is decorated. There is a prominent balcony atop the gate, overlooking the road from the castle. This mashrabiya is used to surveil prisoners and to fortify the entrance, which leads to a small lobby, and opposing vaults that lead to a courtyard. On both floors are corridors with semi-cylindrical and opposing vaults, and a stairway to the upper floor. The prisoners draw water from the well in the center of the castle, and to the east of the castle, two adjacent ponds collect rainwater, for travelers and pilgrims to drink.

1726 massacre

Sources show that the castle was attacked and everybody in it was killed in the Hajj season of AH 1139 / 1726 CE. The castle's fame explains that it was vulnerable to raids, looting, and pillaging, especially in the hajj season of 1699.

Historical sources
"The caravan reached the blessed manzil al-Qatrana. The manzil is located in a wide wadi and has a great qal'a next to it. The gate was closed. People lived there (the owners) and they sell pilgrims hay and other provisions by lowering it from the top of the qal'a. Next to the qal'a is a large pool; and next to it is a smaller one, which filters water before it reaches the large one."
—Al-Khiyari, in Rihlat al-Khiyari: Tuhfat' al-Udaba wa-Salwat al-Ghuraba

Figures in history who mention Qatrana explicitly in their writings are here listed in chronological order, from the 16th–late 19th centuries:
 historian Abd-al-Qadir ibn Muhammed al-Ansari al-Jaziri al-Hanbali (AH 911–977)
 Mustapha Pasha
 Najm al-Din Muhammad ibn Muhammad al-Ghazzi
 al-Hassan Bin Muhammad Al-Biruni
 Katib Çelebi
 Mohammed bin Abd Allah al-Husseini al-Mawsawi Kibrit
 Kadri
 Ibrahim bin Abdul Rahman Al-Khiyari Almadni
 Evliya Çelebi
 Ibn Elwan
 al-Nabulusi
 Abdallah Ibn Husain Imad Abd as-Salam Rauf al-Swaydi
 Edib Mehmed
 Abu al-Qasim ibn Ahmad ibn Ali ibn Ibrahim al-Zayani
 Al-Miknasi
 Johan Lewis Burckhardt
 Muhammad Ali Pasha
 John Edward Gray Hill (from "A Journey to Petra, 1896")
 Muhammad ibn Uthman Sanusi
 Charles Montagu Doughty
 Miz Ughli.

Conservation
Efforts to restore and conserve the site are ongoing in the face of recent "sabotage," "vandalism," and unofficial excavations. These efforts include reinforcement of walls, partial reconstruction (of missing stones), the creation of a tourist path, site documentation, preparation of an action plan, and local job creation.

See also
Other Ottoman khans (Qila') in Jordan
 Khan/Qal'at el-Mafraq
 Manzil al-Zarqa/Qasr Shabib
 Manzil/Qala'at Zizya
 Manzil/Qah'at Dab'ah
 Khan al-Hasa
 Khan al-'Unayzah
 Manzilt/Qal'at Ma'an
 Manzilt/Qal'a Fasu'aa
 Manzilt/Qala'at al-Mudawara
Additional archaeological sites in the Karak Governorate
Kerak Castle
Numeira

References

External links
 Archival Photographs of the site via the American Center for Oriental Research
Photos of Qasr al-Qatraneh from the Manar al-Athar photo archive

qatraneh
qatraneh
Castles in Jordan
Archaeological sites in Jordan